This is the complete list of Asian Games medalists in tennis from 1958 to 2018.

Events

Men's singles

Men's doubles

Men's team

Women's singles

Women's doubles

Women's team

Mixed doubles

References

Medallists from previous Asian Games - Tennis
Sports123 medalists lists

External links
 Olympic Council of Asia

Tennis
medalists